Paul Barry (born 1952) is a British-born, Australian-based journalist.

Paul Barry may also refer to:

 Paul Barry (American football) (1926–2014), American running back
 Paul Barry (songwriter) (active from 1998),  British songwriter and musician
 Paul W. Barry (active 1948–1957), American polo player

See also
 Barry Paul (born 1948), British Olympic fencer
 Paul Barry-Walsh (born 1955), British businessman
 Paul Berry (disambiguation)